The Island of Tears (German: S.O.S. Die Insel der Tränen) is a 1923 German silent film directed by Lothar Mendes and starring Lya De Putti, Paul Wegener, and Lyda Salmonova.

Cast
 Lya De Putti as Lilian - Harding's Tochter  
 Paul Wegener as Jack  
 Lyda Salmonova as Frau des Matrosen Jack  
 Olga Engl as John Harding's Frau  
 Gertrud de Lalsky
 Rudolf Forster as Harry - Offizier der amerik. Marine  
 Eugen Burg as John Harding  
 Alfred Halm as Kapitän der 'Manitoba'  
 Erna Hauk as Stella - Lilian's Freundin

References

Bibliography
 Bock, Hans-Michael & Bergfelder, Tim. The Concise CineGraph. Encyclopedia of German Cinema. Berghahn Books, 2009.

External links

1923 films
Films of the Weimar Republic
Films directed by Lothar Mendes
German silent feature films
German black-and-white films